The 2022 Bunnings NPC season is the seventeenth season of New Zealand's provincial rugby union competition, the National Provincial Championship, since it turned professional in 2006. It involves the top fourteen provincial rugby unions of New Zealand, which – under a new format introduced in 2022 – will all be playing for the same title for the first time since the 2010 season. For sponsorship reasons, the competition is known as the Bunnings NPC. The regular season begins on Friday 5 August 2022, when Manawatū hosts . The Final is scheduled for Saturday 22 October 2022.

Format
In 2022, a new competition format was introduced. In this new format, the 14 provincial unions participating in the Bunnings NPC are no longer competing in two separate divisions – a Premiership and a Championship division – that play for their own title. Instead, the 14 teams are playing for one NPC title and are seeded in two equal conferences: an "Odds Conference" and an "Evens Conference". The seeding is determined by the ranking on the competition table of the previous season, with the 1st, 3rd, 5th, 7th, 9th,11th and 13th ranked teams forming the Odds Conference and the provinces finishing 2nd, 4th, 6th, 8th, 10th, 12th and 14th forming the Evens Conference.

All provincial teams play ten games during the regular season (round robin): six games against the teams in their own conference and four crossover games against teams from the other conference. Five games are played at the provincial union's home ground and five games are away games. In 2022, the ten round robin games are played over a period of nine weeks (starting on Friday 5 August 2022) and include one mid-week game to be played on a Wednesday night.

The regular season is followed by quarter-finals to be played by the four highest ranked teams in each conference. The finals rankings are determined by the number of competition points earned during the regular season. Competition points can be gained in the following way: four points are awarded to the winning team, two points to each team for a draw, and no points for a loss. Teams can also receive a bonus point if they score four or more tries in a match, or lose by seven points or less.

If two or more provincial teams finish with an equal number of competition points, the following tiebreaker rules apply. If two unions are tied, the union which has defeated the other in a head-to-head is placed higher. In case of a draw between them, the side with the biggest points difference is ranked higher. If three or more unions are tied and they have all played each other, the team with most competition points in that year against the other tied unions is ranked higher; if they have not all played each other, the team with the biggest points difference in the round robin is ranked higher. In all cases, if these unions are still tied, the ranking is decided by the highest number of tries scored, the most  points scored, or a coin toss.

Quarter-finals are played within each conference, with the highest ranked team in each conference playing the fourth ranked team in the same conference, and the second ranked team in each conference playing the third ranked team in the same conference:

QF 1: Odds 1 v Odds 4;
QF 2: Odds 2 v Odds 3;
QF 3: Evens 1 v Evens 4; and
QF 4: Evens 2 v Evens 3.

The two quarter-finals winners of the Odds conference will play the two quarter-finals winners of the Evens Conference (QF1 v QF4 and QF2 v QF3) at the home ground of the team with the higher finals ranking.

The NPC Final will be played between the two semi-final winners, again at the home venue of the team with the higher finals ranking.

No changes have been made to the rules governing Ranfurly Shield Challenges. Every home game during the regular season played by the union that holds the Ranfurly Shield is a mandartory challenge match. No challenge matches will be played after the regular season has ended (i.e., during the finals). A holder who competes in the Bunnings NPC must also accept at least two challenges from unions competing in the Heartland Championship, including the winner of the Meads Cup at the end of the previous season. These non-mandatory challenge matches must be played before the start of the NPC season.

Standings
Source: Bunnings NPC standings 2022

Standings progression

Regular season
The regular season of the 2022 Bunnings NPC consists of 10 games that will be played over a period of nine weeks and include one mid-week game. The competition starts on Friday 5 August 2022, when Manawatū hosts  in Palmerston North.

Week 1

Week 2

Week 3

Week 4

Week 5

Week 6

Week 7

Week 8

Week 9

Play-offs

Quarter-finals

Semi-finals

Final

{| border="0" style="width:100%;"
|-
|

Statistics

Leading point scorers

Source: The weekly reviews of the matches published on provincial.rugby (see "Report" in the individual match scoring stats).

Leading try scorers

Source: The weekly reviews of the matches published on provincial.rugby (see "Report" in the individual match scoring stats).

Points by game

Source: Bunnings NPC Fixtures and Results 2022

Tries by game

Source: The weekly reviews of the matches published on provincial.rugby (see "Report" in the individual match scoring stats).

Sanctions

Ranfurly Shield

Pre-season challenges

References

External links

National Provincial Championship
Mitre 10 Cup
Mitre 10 Cup